The president of the Franche-Comté Regional Council prepares and supervises the spending of the budget and the decisions voted by the regional councillors. She is in charge of financial management and is head of the regional administration. It is also her role to ensure the direction of the patrimony (for example the secondary schools) and to represent the institution with the national and European organisms. 

She has numerous functions: convening and chairing meetings, preparing and carrying out deliberations, signing conventions and acting as legal representative of the institution. If necessary, the president can delegate some of his functions to his vice-presidents.

The president of the regional council is assisted by 10 vice-presidents entrusted with different missions. Together they form the bureau which decides the main outlines of regional policy and ensures their implementation.

List of presidents of the Franche-Comté Regional Council

See also 

 Franche-Comté Regional Council

External links
 Franche-Comté Regional Council official website

President of Franche-Comté
Franche-Comté Regional Council
Politics of Franche-Comté